Abdoulaye Kamara (born 6 November 2004) is a Guinean professional footballer who plays as a defensive midfielder for Bundesliga club Borussia Dortmund.

Career

Paris Saint-Germain 
Kamara is a product of the Paris Saint-Germain Academy. He played for the under-19 side of the club in the 2020–21 season despite being three years younger than the maximum age for the team. On 5 August 2020, he made his debut for Paris Saint-Germain's senior team in a 1–0 friendly victory over Sochaux.

Borussia Dortmund 
On 20 July 2021, Kamara signed for Bundesliga club Borussia Dortmund, having declined a professional contract at PSG in order to move to Germany.

Personal life 
Kamara was born in Guinea. He is eligible to represent both Guinea and France internationally.

References

External links 
 Profile at the Borussia Dortmund website
 
 

2004 births
Living people
Guinean footballers
French footballers
Association football midfielders
Guinean emigrants to France
Naturalized citizens of France
French sportspeople of Guinean descent
Black French sportspeople
3. Liga players
Paris Saint-Germain F.C. players
Borussia Dortmund II players
Borussia Dortmund players
Expatriate footballers in Germany
Guinean expatriate footballers
French expatriate footballers
Guinean expatriate sportspeople in Germany
French expatriate sportspeople in Germany